Church station may refer to:

Church station (Buffalo Metro Rail), in Buffalo, New York, United States
Church station (Muni Metro), in San Francisco, California, United States
Church station (Philadelphia), in Philadelphia, Pennsylvania, United States

See also
Church (disambiguation)
Church Street station (disambiguation)
Church Road railway station (disambiguation)